The 1942–43 Allsvenskan was the ninth season of the top division of Swedish handball. Nine teams competed in the league. Majornas IK won the league, but the title of Swedish Champions was awarded to the winner of Svenska mästerskapet. Västerås IK were relegated.

League table

Attendance

References 

Swedish handball competitions